Moving bed biofilm reactor (MBBR) is a type of wastewater treatment process that was first invented by Prof. Hallvard Ødegaard at Norwegian University of Science and Technology in the late 1980s. It was commercialized by Kaldnes Miljöteknologi (now called AnoxKaldnes and owned by Veolia Water Technologies). There are over 700 wastewater treatment systems (both municipal and industrial) installed in over 50 countries. Currently, there are various suppliers of MBBR systems.

Overview 
The MBBR system consists of an aeration tank (similar to an activated sludge tank) with special plastic carriers that provide a surface where a biofilm can grow. The carriers are made of a material with a density close to the density of water (1 g/cm3). An example is high-density polyethylene (HDPE) which has a density close to 0.95 g/cm3. The carriers will be mixed in the tank by the aeration system and thus will have good contact between the substrate in the influent wastewater and the biomass on the carriers.

To prevent the plastic carriers from escaping the aeration it is necessary to have a sieve on the outlet of the tank. To achieve higher concentration of biomass in the bioreactors, hybrid MBBR systems have also been used where suspended and attached biomass co-exist contributing both to biological processes.

There are also anaerobic MBBRs that have been mainly used for industrial wastewater treatment. A 2019 article described a combination of anaerobic (methanogenic) MBBR with aerobic MBBR that was applied in a municipal wastewater treatment laboratory, with simultaneous production of biogas.

Advantages 
The MBBR system is considered a biofilm process. Other conventional biofilm processes for wastewater treatment are called trickling filter, rotating biological contactor (RBC) and biological aerated filter (BAF).  Biofilm processes in general require less space than activated sludge systems because the biomass is more concentrated, and the efficiency of the system is less dependent on the final sludge separation. A disadvantage with other biofilm processes is that they experience bioclogging and build-up of headloss.

MBBR systems don't need a recycling of the sludge, which is the case with activated sludge systems.

The MBBR system is often installed as a retrofit of existing activated sludge tanks to increase the capacity of the existing system. The degree of filling of carriers can be adapted to the specific situation and the desired capacity.  Thus an existing treatment plant can increase its capacity without increasing the footprint by constructing new tanks.

When constructing, the filling degree can be set to, for example, 40% in the beginning, and later be increased to 70% by filling more carriers.  Examples of situations can be population increase in a city for a municipal wastewater treatment plant or increased wastewater production from an industrial factory.

Some other advantages compared to activated sludge systems are:
 Higher effective sludge retention time (SRT) which is favorable for nitrification
 Responds to load fluctuations without operator intervention
 Lower sludge production
 Less area required
 Resilient to toxic shock
 Process performance independent of secondary clarifier (due to the fact that there is no sludge return line).

Large diameter submersible mixers are commonly used as a method for mixing in these systems.

Removal of micropollutants 
Moving bed biofilm reactors have shown promising results to remove micropollutations (MPs) from wastewater.   MPs fall into several groups of chemicals such as pharmaceuticals, organophosphorus pesticides (OPs), care products and endocrine disruptors.   A 2012 article reported described the use of MBBR technology to remove pharmaceuticals such as beta-blockers, analgesics, anti-depressants, and antibiotics from hospital wastewater. Moreover, application of MBBR as a biological technique combined with chemical treatment has attracted a great deal of attention for removal of organophosphorous pesticide from wastewater.  

The advantage of MBBRs can be associated with its high solid retention time, which allows the proliferation of slow-growing microbial communities with multiple functions in biofilms. The dynamics of such microbial communities greatly depends on organic loading in MBBR systems.

See also 
 List of waste-water treatment technologies

References 

Environmental engineering
Sewerage
Waste treatment technology